The Seattle Giants were a minor league baseball team that played in various leagues from 1910 to 1920. Based in Seattle, Washington, United States and owned by Dan Dugdale, they played in the Northwestern League from 1910 to 1917, the Pacific Coast International League in 1918 and 1920, and the Northwest International League in 1919. Two of their ballparks were Yesler Way Park and Dugdale Field. In 1919, they were also known as the Seattle Drydockers.

References

Baseball teams established in 1910
Defunct minor league baseball teams
Professional baseball teams in Washington (state)
1910 establishments in Washington (state)
1920 disestablishments in Washington (state)
Defunct baseball teams in Washington (state)
Northwestern League teams
Baseball teams disestablished in 1920
Baseball in Seattle